This is a list of foreign ministers in 2022.

Africa
  – Ramtane Lamamra (2021–present)
  – Tete António (2020–present)
  – Aurélien Agbénonci (2016–present)
  – Lemogang Kwape (2020–present)
  – 
Rosine Sori-Coulibaly (2021–2022)
Olivia Rouamba  (2022–present)
  – Albert Shingiro (2020–present)
  – Lejeune Mbella Mbella (2015–present)
  – Rui Figueiredo Soares (2021–present)
  – Sylvie Baïpo-Temon (2018–present)
  – Mahamat Zene Cherif (2021–present)
  – Dhoihir Dhoulkamal (2020–present)
  – Jean-Claude Gakosso (2015–present)
  – Christophe Lutundula (2021–present)
  – Mahamoud Ali Youssouf (2005–present)
  – Sameh Shoukry (2014–present)
  – Simeón Oyono Esono Angue (2018–present)
  – Osman Saleh Mohammed (2007–present)
  – Demeke Mekonnen (2020–present)
  – 
Pacôme Moubelet Boubeya (2020–2022)
Michael Moussa Adamo (2022–present)
  – Mamadou Tangara (2018–present)
  – Shirley Ayorkor Botchway (2017–present)
  – Morissanda Kouyaté (2021–present)
  – Suzi Barbosa (2020–present)
  – Kandia Camara (2021–present)
  – Raychelle Omamo (2020–present)
  – 'Matšepo Ramakoae (2020–present)
  – Dee-Maxwell Saah Kemayah, Sr (2020–present)
 – 
Najla Mangoush (2021–present)
Hafez Kaddour (2022–present)
  – 
Patrick Rajoelina (2021–2022)
Richard Randriamandrato (2022–present)
  – 
Eisenhower Mkaka (2020–2022)
Nancy Tembo (2022–present)
  – Abdoulaye Diop (2021–present)
  – Ismail Ould Cheikh Ahmed (2018–present)
  – Alan Ganoo (2021–present)
  – Nasser Bourita (2017–present)
  – Verónica Macamo (2020–present)
  – Netumbo Nandi-Ndaitwah (2012–present)
  – Hassoumi Massoudou (2021–present)
  – Geoffrey Onyeama (2015–present)
  – Vincent Biruta (2019–present)
  – Mohamed Salem Ould Salek (1998–2023)
  – Edite Tenjua (2020–present)
  – Aïssata Tall Sall (2020–present)
  – Sylvestre Radegonde (2020–present)
  – David J. Francis (2021–present)
  – Abdisaid Muse Ali (2021–present)
  – Essa Kayd (2020–present)
  – Naledi Pandor (2019–present)
  – Mayiik Ayii Deng (2021–present)
  – 
Abdalla Omar Bashir (acting) (2021–2022)
Ali Sadiq Ali (acting) (2022–present)
  – Thuli Dladla (2018–present)
  – Liberata Mulamula (2021–present)
  – Robert Dussey (2013–present)
  – Othman Jerandi (2020–present)
  – Jeje Odongo (2021–present)
  – Stanley Kakubo (2021–present)
  – Frederick Shava (2021–present)

Asia
  – Inal Ardzinba (2021–present)
  – Amir Khan Muttaqi (acting) (2021–present)
  – Ararat Mirzoyan (2021–present)
  – David Babayan (2021–present)
  – Jeyhun Bayramov (2020–present)
  – Abdullatif bin Rashid Al Zayani (2020–present)
  – Abulkalam Abdul Momen (2019–present)
  – Tandi Dorji (2018–present)
  – Hassanal Bolkiah (2015–present)
  – Prak Sokhonn (2016–present)
  – Wang Yi (2013–present)
  – Adaljíza Magno (2020–present)
  – 
David Zalkaliani (2018–2022)
Ilia Darchiashvili (2022–present)
  – Subrahmanyam Jaishankar (2019–present)
  – Retno Marsudi (2014–present)
  – Hossein Amir-Abdollahian (2021–present)
  – Fuad Hussein (2020–present)
  – Safeen Muhsin Dizayee (2019–present)
  – Eli Cohen (2022-present)
  – Yoshimasa Hayashi (2021–present)
  – Ayman Safadi (2017–present)
  – Mukhtar Tleuberdi (2019–present)
  – 
Ri Son-gwon (2020–2022)
Choe Son-hui (2022-present)
  – 
Chung Eui-yong (2021–2022)
Park Jin (2022–present)
  –
 Sheikh Ahmad Nasser Al-Mohammad Al-Sabah (2019–2022)
 Sheikh Salem Abdullah Al-Jaber Al-Sabah (2022–present)
  – 
Ruslan Kazakbayev (2020–2022)
Jeenbek Kulubaev (2022–present)
  – Saleumxay Kommasith (2016–present)
  – Abdallah Bou Habib (2021–present)
  –  1. Saifuddin Abdullah (2021–2022)  2. Zambry Abdul Kadir (2022–present)
  – Abdulla Shahid (2018–present) 
  – Battsetseg Batmunkh (2021–present)
 
 – Wunna Maung Lwin (2021–present)
 National Unity Government of Myanmar (body claiming to be the legitimate government of Myanmar (Burma), existing in parallel with State Administration Council military junta) – Zin Mar Aung (2021–present)
  – Narayan Khadka (2021–present)
  – Sayyid Badr Albusaidi (2020–present)
  – 
Shah Mahmood Qureshi (2018–2022)
Bilawal Bhutto Zardari (2022-present)
  – Riyad al-Maliki (2007–present)
  –
Teodoro Locsin Jr. (2018–2022)
Enrique Manalo (2022–present)
  – Mohammed bin Abdulrahman bin Jassim Al Thani (2016–present)

  – Prince Faisal bin Farhan Al Saud (2019–present)
  – Vivian Balakrishnan (2015–present)
  – Dmitry Medoyev (2017–present)
  –  
 Prof. Gamini Lakshman Peiris (2021–2022)
Ali Sabry PC AAL (2022–present)
  – Faisal Mekdad (2020–present)
  – Joseph Wu (2018–present)
  – Sirodjidin Aslov (2013–present)
  – Don Pramudwinai (2015–present)
  – Mevlüt Çavuşoğlu (2015–present)
  – Raşit Meredow (2001–present)
  – Sheikh Abdullah bin Zayed Al Nahyan (2006–present)
  – 
Abdulaziz Kamilov (2012–2022)
Vladimir Norov (acting) (2022-present)
  – Bùi Thanh Sơn (2021–present)

Republic of Yemen – Ahmad Awad bin Mubarak (2020–present)
Supreme Political Council (unrecognised, rival government) – Hisham Abdullah (2016–present)

Europe
  – Olta Xhaçka (2020–present)
  – Maria Ubach i Font (2017–present)
  – Alexander Schallenberg (2021–present)
 Belarus
  – Vladimir Makei (2012–present)
 National Anti-Crisis Management ("Shadow-government-like" organisation) – Anatoly Kotov (2020–present)
  – Sophie Wilmès (2020–present)
  – Pascal Smet (2019–present)
  – Jan Jambon (2019–present)
  Wallonia – Elio Di Rupo (2019–present)
  – Bisera Turković (2019–present)
  – Teodora Genchovska (2021–present)
  – Gordan Grlić-Radman (2019–present)
  – 
Nikos Christodoulides (2018–2022)
Ioannis Kasoulidis (2022–present)
  – Jan Lipavský (2021–present)
  – Jeppe Kofod (2019–present)
  – Jenis av Rana (2019–present)
  –
Eva-Maria Liimets (2021–2022)
Andres Sutt (2022–present) (acting)
  – Pekka Haavisto (2019–present)
  – 
Jean-Yves Le Drian (2017–2022)
Catherine Colonna (2022–present)
  – Annalena Baerbock (2021–present)
  – Nikos Dendias (2019–present)
  – Jonathan Le Tocq (2016–present)
  – Péter Szijjártó (2014–present)
  – Þórdís Kolbrún R. Gylfadóttir (2021–present)
  – Simon Coveney (2017–present)
  – Luigi Di Maio (2019–present)
Antonio Tajani (2022-present)
  – Ian Gorst (2018–present)
  – Donika Gërvalla-Schwarz (2021–present)
  – Edgars Rinkēvičs (2011–present)
  – Dominique Hasler (2021–present)
  – Gabrielius Landsbergis (2020–present)
  Lugansk People's Republic – Vladislav Deinevo (2017–present)
  – Jean Asselborn (2004–present)
  – Bujar Osmani (2020–present)
  –
Evarist Bartolo (2020–2022)
Ian Borg (2022–present)
  – Nicu Popescu (2021–present)
  Gagauzia – Vitaliy Vlah (2015–present)
  – 
Laurent Anselmi (2019–2022)
Isabelle Berro-Amadeï (2022–present)
  –
Đorđe Radulović (2020–2022)
Ranko Krivokapić (2022–present)
  – 
Ben Knapen (2021–2022)
Wopke Hoekstra (2022–present)
  – 
Tahsin Ertuğruloğlu (2020–2022)
Hasan Taçoy (2022–present)
  – Anniken Huitfeldt (2021–present)
  – Zbigniew Rau (2020–present)
  – 
Augusto Santos Silva (2015–2022)
António Costa (2022)
João Gomes Cravinho (2022–present)
  – Bogdan Aurescu (2019–present)
  – Sergey Lavrov (2004–present)
  – Luca Beccari (2020–present)
  – Nikola Selaković (2020–present)
  – Ivan Korčok (2021–present)
  –
Anže Logar (2020–2022)
Tanja Fajon (2022–present)
  – José Manuel Albares (2021–present)
  – Paula Fernández Viaña (2019–present)
  – Victòria Alsina Burgués (2021–present)
  – Ann Linde (2019–present)
  – Ignazio Cassis (2017–present)
  – Vitaly Ignatyev (2015–present)

  – Dmytro Kuleba (2020–present)
  – James Cleverly (2022–present)
  – Angus Robertson (2021–present)
  – Archbishop Paul Gallagher (2014–present)

North America and the Caribbean
  – E.P. Chet Greene (2018–present)
  – Fred Mitchell (2021–present)
  – Jerome Walcott (2018–present)
  – Eamon Courtenay (2020–present)
  – Mélanie Joly (2021–present)
  Quebec – Nadine Girault (2018–present)
  – Rodolfo Solano (2020–present)
  – Bruno Rodríguez Parrilla (2009–present)
  – Kenneth Darroux (2019–present)
  – Roberto Álvarez (2020–present)
  – Alexandra Hill Tinoco (2019–present)
  Greenland – Múte Bourup Egede (2021–present)
  – Oliver Joseph (2020–present)
 – 
Pedro Brolo (2020–2022)
Mario Búcaro (2022–present)
  – Jean Victor Généus (2021–present)
  – 
Lisandro Rosales (2019–2022)
Eduardo Enrique Reina (2022–present)
  – Kamina Johnson-Smith (2016–present)
  – Marcelo Ebrard (2018–present)
  – Denis Moncada (2017–present)
  – Erika Mouynes (2020–present)
  – Omar J. Marrero (2021–present)
  –
Mark Brantley (2015–2022)
Vincent Byron (2022–present)
  – Alva Baptiste (2021–present)
  – Ralph Gonsalves (2020–present)
  – Amery Browne (2020–present)
  – Antony Blinken (2021–present)

Oceania
  – 
Marise Payne (2018–2022)
Penny Wong (2022–present)
  – Mark Brown (2013–present)
  – Frank Bainimarama (2020–present)
   – Édouard Fritch (2014–present)
  – Taneti Mamau (2016–present)
  – Casten Nemra (2020–present)
  – Kandhi A. Elieisar (2019–present)
  – Lionel Aingimea (2019–present)
  – Nanaia Mahuta (2020–present)
  – Dalton Tagelagi (2020–present)
  – Gustav Aitaro (2021–present)
  – 
Soroi Eoe (2020–2022)
Justin Tkatchenko (2022–present)
  – Naomi Mataʻafa (2021–present)
  – Jeremiah Manele (2019–present)
  – Kelihiano Kalolo (2021–present)
  – Fekitamoeloa ʻUtoikamanu (2021–present)
  – Simon Kofe (2019–present)
  – Mark Ati (2020–present)

South America
  – Santiago Cafiero (2021–present)
  – Rogelio Mayta (2020–present)
  – Mauro Luiz Iecker Vieira (2022–present)
  – 
Andrés Allamand (2020–2022)
Carolina Valdivia (acting) (2022)
Antonia Urrejola (2022–present)
  – 
Marta Lucía Ramírez (2021–2022) 
Álvaro Leyva (2022–present)
  – 
Mauricio Montalvo Samaniego (2021–2022)
Juan Carlos Holguín (2022–present)
  – Hugh Todd (2020–present)
  – Euclides Acevedo (2021–present)
  – 
Óscar Maúrtua (2021–2022)
César Landa (2022)
Miguel Ángel Rodríguez Mackay (2022–present)
  – Albert Ramdin (2020–present)
  – Francisco Bustillo (2020–present)
  – Félix Plasencia (2021–present)

See also

List of current foreign ministers

References

Minister of Foreign Affairs
Foreign ministers
2022 in international relations
Foreign ministers
2022